The Man from Glengarry is a 1922 American-Canadian silent drama film directed by Henry MacRae and starring Anders Randolf, Warner Richmond, and Pauline Garon. It is based on the 1901 novel of the same title by Ralph Connor. The film was distributed in the United States by W.W. Hodkinson in 1923. It was one of three silent films directed by MacRae based on the works of Connor.

Cast

Preservation
With no prints of The Man from Glengarry located in any film archives, it is a lost film.

References

Bibliography
 Robert B. Connelly. The Silents: Silent Feature Films, 1910-36, Volume 40, Issue 2. December Press, 1998.

External links

1922 films
1922 drama films
1920s English-language films
American silent feature films
Silent American drama films
American black-and-white films
Canadian silent feature films
Canadian drama films
Canadian black-and-white films
Films distributed by W. W. Hodkinson Corporation
Films directed by Henry MacRae
1920s American films
1920s Canadian films